The Lochbroom Free Church is a place of worship of the Free Church of Scotland in Ullapool, in the Highland council area of Scotland. The church was built in 1909.

External links 
 Lochbroom Free Church

Churches completed in 1909
Churches in Highland (council area)